Captain Evan Walter Scott, USN (December 12, 1876 – September 22, 1955) was an American Navy officer who served as the 2nd Chief of Chaplains of the United States Navy from 1921 to 1926.

References

Further reading 

1876 births
1955 deaths
United States Navy officers
Chiefs of Chaplains of the United States Navy
Burials at Arlington National Cemetery